The Gustaf Gründgens Prize is a German theatre award. It is named after the actor, director and intendant Gustaf Gründgens and is awarded for "significant contribution to the performing arts in Hamburg". The prize is endowed with €15,000. Since 2012, it has been awarded on the initiative of Lions Clubs Hamburg at the Ernst Deutsch Theater. A jury decides the winner.

Recipients
 2013 John Neumeier
 2015 Joop van den Ende
 2017 
 2019 Joachim Meyerhoff
 2021 Volker Lechtenbrink

References

External links
 

German theatre awards
Awards established in 2012
2012 establishments in Germany
Culture in Hamburg